The rufous mourner (Rhytipterna holerythra) is a small passerine bird in the tyrant flycatcher family.  It breeds from southwestern Mexico to northwestern Ecuador. It was formerly believed to be a cotinga, but well-supported anatomical evidence has shown it to be related to tyrant flycatchers of the genera Myiarchus, Sirystes and Casiornis.

Its plumage is entirely rufous, brighter on the underparts, and with darker brown wings. The base of the bill is pink or horn-coloured.

This bird is found in lowlands and foothills up to  altitude in wet forests, adjacent old second growth, semi-open areas and shady plantations. The rufous mourner is seen alone, in family groups or as part of a mixed-species feeding flock. It perches on a twig from which it sallies forth to catch large insects and  caterpillars and many seeds and fruit. Usually, the food is taken in flight.

It nests in tree cavities, especially old woodpecker holes. It may also nest in holes in earth banks.

Footnotes

References
 Foster, Mercedes S. (2007): The potential of fruiting trees to enhance converted habitats for migrating birds in southern Mexico. Bird Conservation International 17(1): 45–61. PDF fulltext
 Scholes, E. (2004): Rufous Mourner (Rhytipterna holerythra). Pp. 427 in: del Hoyo, J., Elliott, A., & Christie, D. A. eds. (2004). Handbook of the Birds of the World. Vol.  9. Cotingas to Pipits and Wagtails. Lynx Edicions, Barcelona.
 Stiles, F. Gary & Skutch, Alexander Frank (1989): A guide to the birds of Costa Rica. Comistock, Ithaca. 

rufous mourner
Birds of Central America
Birds of the Tumbes-Chocó-Magdalena
rufous mourner
rufous mourner
rufous mourner